Elections to Penwith District Council were held on 7 May 1998.  One third of the council was up for election and the council stayed under no overall control. Overall turnout was 31.0%.

After the election, the composition of the council was
Liberal Democrat 12
Conservative 7
Independent 7
Labour 6
Others 2

Results

References

"Council poll results", The Guardian 9 May 1998 page 16
Turnout figures
Penwith District Council Election Results 1973-2007

1998 English local elections
1998
1990s in Cornwall